Niklas Heidemann (born 6 January 1995) is a German former professional footballer who played as a defender.

References

External links
 Profile at FuPa.net

1995 births
Living people
People from Schwerte
Sportspeople from Arnsberg (region)
Footballers from North Rhine-Westphalia
German footballers
Association football defenders
MSV Duisburg II players
MSV Duisburg players
Wuppertaler SV players
SC Preußen Münster players
3. Liga players
Regionalliga players